Allen Wade Kerr (born November 19, 1956) is an American politician. He served as a Republican member for the 32nd district of the Arkansas House of Representatives.

Kerr was born in Little Rock, Arkansas. He established the Allen Kerr Insurance Company in 1981. In 2013 the company was bought by Simmons Bank, with Kerr continuing as president. In 2009, he was elected for the 32nd district of the Arkansas House of Representatives. Kerr succeeded Sid Rosenbaum. In 2015, he was succeeded by Jim Sorvillo for the 32nd district. Kerr was Arkansas Commissioner of Insurance from 2015 to 2020, when he resigned to work in the private sector.

References 

1956 births
Living people
Politicians from Little Rock, Arkansas
Republican Party members of the Arkansas House of Representatives
21st-century American politicians
Businesspeople from Arkansas
Insurance agents
State insurance commissioners of the United States